Alexander Maximiliam Michael Junior Nylander Altelius (born 2 March 1998) is a Canadian-born Swedish professional ice hockey forward currently playing for the  Pittsburgh Penguins of the National Hockey League (NHL). He was selected 8th overall by the Buffalo Sabres in the 2016 NHL Entry Draft.

Playing career

Major junior
Nylander was selected 12th overall by the Mississauga Steelheads of the Ontario Hockey League at the 2015 Canadian Hockey League Import Draft. On 5 September 2015, Nylander committed to Steelheads with his father joining as assistant coach. His reasons for joining include being close to his brother William and to have the chance to play the Canadian style of hockey.

In his only season with the Steelheads, Nylander led all rookies in scoring, and was awarded both the Emms Family Award as OHL Rookie of the Year and CHL Rookie of the Year.

Leading up to the NHL draft, Nylander was ranked the No. 3 North American skater. He was described as a dynamic offensive player with a great shot and playmaking ability.

Professional
Nylander was selected 8th overall by the Buffalo Sabres in the 2016 NHL Draft. On 15 July 2016, the Sabres signed Nylander to a three-year entry-level contract.

Nylander was called up to the NHL for the first time on 3 April 2017, to play in a game against the Toronto Maple Leafs. Nylander played 14:28 minutes during the 4–2 loss. After playing four games in the NHL he was reassigned back to their AHL affiliate, the Rochester Americans.

The Sabres assigned Nylander to their AHL affiliate before finalizing their roster for the 2017–18 season. Nylander suffered a lower-body injury in mid-September during the Buffalo Sabres' first prospect game, causing him to miss the rest of the training camp and the beginning of the 2017–18 AHL season. He returned to the lineup on 17 November 2017, for a game against the Hartford Wolf Pack. Despite a slow start, Nylander was called up to the NHL on 3 April 2018. He recorded his first career NHL goal on 6 April 2018 in a game against the Tampa Bay Lightning. After the Sabres failed to qualify for the 2018 Stanley Cup playoffs, Nylander was reassigned to the AHL.

On 9 July 2019, Nylander was traded by the Sabres to the Chicago Blackhawks in exchange for fellow first-rounder Henri Jokiharju and opted to wear sweater #92 with the club, the same number his father wore. Nylander appeared in 65 games during the condensed 2019–20 NHL season for the Blackhawks, where he recorded 10 goals and 16 assists. Nylander appeared in eight postseason games for Chicago but failed to register a point. He injured his left knee in the first round of the 2020 Stanley Cup playoffs, and missed the entire 2020–21 NHL season while recovering from surgery.

Nylander re-signed with Chicago on a one-year contract worth $874,125 on 16 August 2021.

Beginning the  season on the injured reserve, Nylander missed the first half of the season. On returning to health, Nylander was traded to the Pittsburgh Penguins, in exchange for Sam Lafferty on 5 January 2022.

International play

Despite being born in Canada, like his brother, Nylander represents Sweden in international play.

At the 2016 IIHF World Junior Championships held in Helsinki, Nylander led the Swedish team in points with four goals and five assists. Team Sweden finished fourth at the tournament.

Nylander was also chosen to represent Sweden at the 2018 IIHF World Junior Championships. Nylander led Team Sweden to the silver medal in the 2018 World Junior Championships where he had 1 goal and 6 assists in 7 games. He was also awarded Player of the game.

Personal life
Alexander was born in Calgary while his father, Michael, played for the Calgary Flames.
He spent the majority of his youth in the United States where his father played for a multitude of NHL teams, and spending the summers in Sweden.

His older brother, William plays for the Toronto Maple Leafs. He was also drafted 8th overall, 2 years earlier.

Career statistics

Regular season and playoffs

International

References

External links

1998 births
Living people
AIK IF players
Buffalo Sabres draft picks
Buffalo Sabres players
Canadian expatriate ice hockey players in the United States
Canadian ice hockey right wingers
Canadian people of Swedish descent
Chicago Blackhawks players
Mississauga Steelheads players
National Hockey League first-round draft picks
Pittsburgh Penguins players
Rochester Americans players
Rockford IceHogs (AHL) players
Ice hockey people from Calgary
Ice hockey people from Stockholm
Swedish expatriate ice hockey players in the United States
Swedish ice hockey right wingers
Wilkes-Barre/Scranton Penguins players